Addicted may refer to:

Film and television
 Addicted (2002 film), a South Korean film
 Possession (2009 film), a U.S. remake of the South Korean film starring Sarah Michelle Gellar
 Addicted (TV series), an American reality television series
 Addicted (2014 film), a film adaptation of the novel by Zane
 Addicted (web series), a Chinese Boys' Love web series

Music

Albums
 Addicted (Devin Townsend Project album), or the title song
 Addicted (Sweetbox album), or the title song (see below)

Songs
 "Addicted" (Ace Young song)
 "Addicted" (Bliss n Eso song)
 "Addicted" (Cheryl Wheeler song), covered by Dan Seals
 "Addicted" (Danny Fernandes song)
 "Addicted" (Enrique Iglesias song)
 "Addicted" (Saving Abel song)
 "Addicted" (Simple Plan song)
 "Addicted" (Sweetbox song)
 "Addicted", by Amy Winehouse from Back to Black
 "Addicted", by Camp Mulla
 "Addicted", by Ciara from Ciara: The Evolution (UK & Europe)
 "Addicted", by Devin Townsend Project from Addicted
 "Addicted", by DJ Assad featuring Mohombi, Craig David & Greg Parys
 "Addicted", by Eminem from Recovery
 "Addicted", by Ivy Lies
 "Addicted", by Juliana Hatfield from Become What You Are
 "Addicted", by Kelly Clarkson from Breakaway
 "Addicted", by LeRoux from Last Safe Place
 "Addicted", by Lovebites from Clockwork Immortality
 "Addicted", by Madonna from Rebel Heart
 "Addicted", by Marit Larsen from The Chase
 "Addicted", by Ne-Yo from Because of You
 "Addicted", by Neil Finn from Try Whistling This
 "Addicted", by P.O.D. from When Angels & Serpents Dance
 "Addicted", by Prince Royce from Phase II

Literature
 Addicted, an autobiography by Tony Adams
 Addicted, a novel by Zane

See also
Addiction (disambiguation)
Addictive (disambiguation)